Xin Juedai Shuangjiao is a Taiwanese television series adapted from Gu Long's novel Juedai Shuangjiao. The series was first aired on TTV in Taiwan in 1986.

Cast
 Sharon Yeung as Xiaoyu'er
 Huang Hsiang-lien as Hua Wuque
 King Doi-yum as Tie Xinlan
 Wong Wai-man as Su Ying
 Su Tsui-yu as Murong Jiu
 Lü Ying-ying as Zhang Jing
 Lung Chuan-jen as Black Spider
 Tien Feng as Jiang Biehe
 Cheng Ping-chun as Jiang Yulang
 Chang Fu-mei as Yaoyue
 Chang Min-min as Lianxing
 Ku Cheng as Yan Nantian
 Hao Man as Tu Jiaojiao
 Chen Ya-lien as Tie Pinggu
 Lee Tao-hung as Jiang Feng
 Chang Ying-chen as Hua Yuenu

External links

Works based on Juedai Shuangjiao
Taiwanese wuxia television series
1986 Taiwanese television series debuts
1980s Taiwanese television series
Television shows based on works by Gu Long